Helen Keller School may refer to any of the following:

 The Helen Keller School at the Alabama Institute for the Deaf and Blind
 Helen Keller Junior High School (Schaumburg, Illinois)
 Helen Keller Middle School in Easton, Connecticut